Jake Rosholt (born September 2, 1982) is an American retired mixed martial artist and former collegiate amateur wrestler. A professional competitor from 2007-2012, he competed for the UFC, WEC, Bellator, and Shark Fights. He is the older brother of current heavyweight MMA fighter/Oklahoma State NCAA Championship finalist Jared Rosholt.

Early life
Born and raised in Sandpoint, Idaho, Rosholt graduated from Sandpoint High School.

He attended Oklahoma State University in Stillwater and won the  NCAA Division I wrestling title in 2003 as a freshman and the  title in 2005 and 2006.  He was a four-time All-American and 2004 Big 12 Conference champion.

He placed second in the Big 12 Conference in 2005 and 2006, but went on to win NCAA championships both years, making him the fifteenth three-time NCAA champion in Oklahoma State history and just their 10th four-time All-American. He ended his college career with a  record.

Mixed martial arts career
In the spring of 2007, Jake began training for MMA competition at the Las Vegas-based Xtreme Couture gym. He is signed with the Team Takedown management company. He made his WEC debut at WEC 36, facing Nissen Osterneck. Rosholt had difficulty defending against Osterneck's stand-up, but was able to secure a number of takedowns and dominate on the ground before winning by technical knockout. Soon after, the WEC dissolved their middleweight and light heavyweight divisions, and Rosholt was one of the fighters transferred to the UFC.

Ultimate Fighting Championship
Rosholt was originally scheduled to face Alessio Sakara at UFC Fight Night: Lauzon vs. Stephens, but Sakara withdrew, due to injury, and was replaced by International Fight League champion Dan Miller who quickly disposed of Rosholt in the first round via guillotine choke.

In his second UFC fight, Rosholt defeated The Ultimate Fighter 1 alumni Chris Leben at UFC 102. He won the fight after choking out Leben in round 3. Jake earned the $60,000 bonus for submission of the night. Rosholt lost to Kendall Grove by submission on November 21, 2009 at UFC 106. Following the loss, Rosholt was cut from the UFC.

Post UFC
Rosholt was set to face UFC and MMA vet Jeremy Horn on April 16 on the "Bad Boys 2" card for King of the Cage, but the fight was canceled when Rosholt sustained a neck injury the day before the event. Rosholt then faced John Ott at Titan FC 18 on May 27, 2011. Rosholt dominated most of the fight until he landed an illegal knee in the third round, resulting in a disqualification loss. However, on June 21, 2011, the Kansas Athletic Commission announced it had overturned the ruling to a no-contest, stating that the knee was landed unintentionally.

Rosholt then fought in a rematch against Matt Horwich at Shark Fights 17: Horwich vs. Rosholt 2 on July 15, 2011. In their first fight, Horwich defeated Rosholt by TKO in the third round in November 2010. This time however, Rosholt used a more conservative strategy as he dominated every round on all three judges scorecards to win a unanimous decision.

Rosholt made his light heavyweight debut against Matt Thompson at XKO 15 on June 2, 2012. Rosholt lost the bout via submission in the first round.

Rosholt faced Anthony Johnson at Xtreme Fight Night 9 on September 21, 2012. He lost the fight via TKO due to a head kick in the second round.

Championships and accomplishments

Mixed martial arts
Ultimate Fighting Championship
Submission of the Night (One time) vs. Chris Leben

Collegiate wrestling
 NCAA Division I Wrestling Championships
  2003 NCAA Division I 184-pound wrestling champion 
  2005 NCAA Division I 197-pound wrestling champion
  2006 NCAA Division I 197-pound wrestling champion 
 NCAA Division I All-American (Four times) 
 Big 12 Conference Wrestling Championships
 2004 Big 12 Conference 184-pound wrestling champion

Scholastic wrestling
 2001 high school 189-pound national champion

Mixed martial arts record

|-
| Loss
| align=center| 12–5 (1)
| Anthony Johnson
| TKO (head kick)
| Xtreme Fight Night 9
| 
| align=center| 2
| align=center| 4:22
| Tulsa, Oklahoma, United States
| 
|-
| Loss
| align=center| 12–4 (1)
| Matt Thompson
| Submission (kneebar)
| XKO 15
| 
| align=center| 1
| align=center| 4:16
| Arlington, Texas, United States
| 
|-
| Win
| align=center| 12–3 (1)
| Matt Horwich
| Decision (unanimous)
| Shark Fights 17: Horwich vs. Rosholt 2
| 
| align=center| 3
| align=center| 5:00
| Frisco, Texas, United States
| 
|-
| NC
| align=center| 11–3 (1)
| John Ott
| No Contest (illegal knee)
| Titan Fighting Championships 18
| 
| align=center| 3
| align=center| 4:23
| Kansas City, Kansas, United States
| 
|-
| Win
| align=center| 11–3
| John Malbrough
| Submission (arm-triangle choke)
| Cowboy MMA: Caged Cowboys
| 
| align=center| 1
| align=center| 1:42
| Ponca City, Oklahoma, United States
| 
|-
| Win
| align=center| 10–3
| Brandon McDowell
| TKO (punches)
| Back Alley Promotions
| 
| align=center| 1
| align=center| 1:36
| Arlington, Texas, United States
| 
|-
| Win
| align=center| 9–3
| John Bryant
| Technical Submission (rear-naked choke)
| Bellator 37
| 
| align=center| 1
| align=center| 1:02
| Concho, Oklahoma, United States
| 
|-
| Win
| align=center| 8–3
| Josh Smidt
| Submission (guillotine choke)
| C3 Fights: SlamFest 
| 
| align=center| 1
| align=center| 1:41
| Newkirk, Oklahoma, United States
| 
|-
| Loss
| align=center| 7–3
| Matt Horwich
| TKO (punches)
| Xtreme Fight Night: Rosholt vs. Horwich 
| 
| align=center| 3
| align=center| 2:56
| Tulsa, Oklahoma, United States
| 
|-
| Win
| align=center| 7–2
| Rudy Lindsey
| Submission (rear-naked choke)
| XFL: March Badness
| 
| align=center| 1
| align=center| 2:37
| Tulsa, Oklahoma, United States
| 
|-
| Loss
| align=center| 6–2
| Kendall Grove
| Submission (triangle choke)
| UFC 106
| 
| align=center| 1
| align=center| 3:59
| Las Vegas, Nevada, United States
| 
|-
| Win
| align=center| 6–1
| Chris Leben
| Technical Submission (arm-triangle choke)
| UFC 102
| 
| align=center| 3
| align=center| 1:30
| Portland, Oregon, United States
| 
|-
| Loss
| align=center| 5–1
| Dan Miller
| Submission (guillotine choke)
| UFC Fight Night: Lauzon vs. Stephens
| 
| align=center| 1
| align=center| 1:03
| Tampa, Florida, United States
| 
|-
| Win
| align=center| 5–0
| Nissen Osterneck
| TKO (punches)
| WEC 36: Faber vs. Brown
| 
| align=center| 2
| align=center| 3:48
| Hollywood, Florida, United States
| 
|-
| Win
| align=center| 4–0
| Chad Jay
| TKO (punches)
| Xtreme Fighting League
| 
| align=center| 3
| align=center| 2:37
| Tulsa, Oklahoma, United States
| 
|-
| Win
| align=center| 3–0
| Jeremiah Caves
| TKO (punches)
| HRP: Fight Night
| 
| align=center| 1
| align=center| 1:42
| Tulsa, Oklahoma, United States
| 
|-
| Win
| align=center| 2–0
| Christopher Clark
| TKO (punches)
| Masters of the Cage 16
| 
| align=center| 3
| align=center| 2:37
| Oklahoma City, Oklahoma, United States
| 
|-
| Win
| align=center| 1–0
| Dusty Miller
| Submission (guillotine choke)
| Masters of the Cage 15
| 
| align=center| 1
| align=center| 3:40
| Oklahoma City, Oklahoma, United States
|

See also
List of male mixed martial artists

References

External links
 
 
 Jake Rosholt profile at the National Wrestling Hall of Fame
 Oklahoma State University Athletics – Jake Rosholt

American male sport wrestlers
American male mixed martial artists
Mixed martial artists from Nevada
Middleweight mixed martial artists
Living people
1982 births
People from Sandpoint, Idaho
Light heavyweight mixed martial artists
Mixed martial artists utilizing collegiate wrestling
Ultimate Fighting Championship male fighters